Žiča is a village in the municipality of Kraljevo, Serbia.

See also
Populated places in Serbia

References

Populated places in Raška District